Xenochrophis is a genus of snakes in the subfamily Natricinae of the family Colubridae. The genus is endemic to Asia. Some members have been moved to the genus Fowlea.

Etymology
The generic nomen of Xenochrophis is presumably derived from the Greek xénos, meaning foreign, strange; chros, meaning color; and ophis, meaning snake. The generic nomen probably refers to the distinctive color pattern of this type species. The gender of this generic name is masculine.

Species of Xenochrophis
The following species are recognized as being valid.

References

Further reading
Boulenger GA (1893). Catalogue of the Snakes in the British Museum (Natural History). Vol. I., Containing the Families ... Colubridæ Aglyphæ, part. London: Trustees of the British Museum (Natural History). (Taylor and Francis, printers). xiii + 448 pp. + Plates I-XXVIII. (Genus Xenochrophis, p. 191).
Günther ACLG (1864). The Reptiles of British India. London: The Ray Society. (Taylor and Francis, printers). xxvii + 452 pp. + Plates I-XXII. (Xenochrophis, new genus, p. 273).

Smith MA (1943). The Fauna of British India, Ceylon and Burma, Including the Whole of the Indo-Chinese Sub-region. Reptilia and Amphibia. Vol. III.—Serpentes. London: Secretary of State for India. (Taylor and Francis, printers). xii + 583 pp. (Genus Xenochrophis, p. 317).

External links
Species list at Animal Diversity Web

 
Snake genera
Taxa named by Albert Günther